St. Nicholas Hotel may refer to:

 St. Nicholas Hotel (Albany, Georgia), listed on the NRHP in Georgia
 St. Nicholas Hotel (Springfield, Illinois), listed on the NRHP in Illinois
 St. Nicholas Hotel (St. Louis, Missouri)
 St. Nicholas Hotel (Omaha, Nebraska)
 St. Nicholas Hotel (New York City)